Frank Facher (born 11 June 1989) is a German speedway rider who rode for PSŻ Poznań in the 2010 Polish Speedway First League. 
He signed on Friday 30 July 2010 for the Stoke Potters of the British Premier League on a full contract to replace the injured Hynek Stichauer.

Career details

World Championships 
 Individual U-21 World Championship
 2007 - 14th placed in the Semi-Final One
 2008 - 10th placed in Qualifying Round Two
 2009 - 9th placed in Qualifying Round Two
 2010 - qualify to the Semi-Final Two
 Team U-21 World Championship
 2006 - 4th placed in the Qualifying Round One for Germany II
 2007 -  Abensberg - 4th place (0 pts)
 2008 - 3rd place in the Qualifying Round Two
 2009 - 2nd place in the Qualifying Round One
 2010 - 3rd place in the Qualifying Round Two

European Championships 
 Individual European Championship
 2008 - qualify to the Semi-Final One, but was replaced
 Individual U-19 European Championship
 2008 - 7th placed in the Semi-Final Three
 2009 - 9th placed in the Semi-Final One
 Team U-19 European Championship
 2008 -  Rawicz - Runner-up (8 pts)

See also 
 Germany national speedway team (U21, U19)

References 

1989 births
Living people
German speedway riders